Oakville North—Burlington is a federal electoral district in Halton Region, Ontario.

History
Oakville North—Burlington was created by the 2012 federal electoral boundaries redistribution and was legally defined in the 2013 representation order. It came into effect upon the call of the 42nd Canadian federal election, scheduled for October 2015. The riding was created out of part of the electoral district of Halton.

2015 federal election

Conservative
On June 7, 2015, at the Burlington Convention Centre, Conservative members of the Oakville North—Burlington Electoral District Association nominated Effie Triantafilopoulos as their official candidate for the October 19, 2015 federal election.

Green Party
Adnan Shahbaz  is an educator working in the Curriculum Support Services division of a local school board as an Instructional Coach. He has worked as a classroom teacher, a behavioral support and special education teacher for nearly a decade. Adnan was born and raised in Toronto and has called Oakville and Burlington home since 2001. He is the only candidate who actually lives in the riding.

Liberal
Ward 6 Councillor for Oakville, Max Khan bested aviation-pilot Rohit Dhamjia by an unknown number of votes in the party's nomination vote on September 25, 2014, in Oakville.
Khan died at Oakville Trafalgar Memorial Hospital on March 29, 2015, vacating his role as the Liberals candidate.
Oakville Town Councillor and longtime community volunteer Pam Damoff was acclaimed as the Liberal candidate on May 26, 2015.

Libertarian
On January 6, 2015, the Libertarian Party of Canada nominated David Clement. He is a local entrepreneur in the consulting field.

NDP
On March 22, 2015 members from the ONB NDP nominated Rebecca Rajcak, an OSSTF member and high school teacher in Oakville. She later resigned the candidacy and Janice Best, a local union official, replaced her as the NDP candidate.

Demographics 
According to the 2021 Canada Census

Ethnic groups: 54.9% White, 16.0% South Asian, 8.6% Chinese, 5.6% Arab, 3.4% Black, 2.5% Latin American, 1.8% Korean, 1.8% Filipino, 1.1% Indigenous, 1.1% West Asian

Languages: 57.5% English, 5.3% Mandarin, 4.1% Arabic, 2.6% Spanish, 2.5% Urdu, 1.7% Punjabi, 1.5% Portuguese, 1.4% Polish, 1.3% Korean, 1.3% Hindi, 1.3% French, 1.2% Cantonese, 1.1% Italian, 1.0% Russian

Religions: 52.4% Christian (29.6% Catholic, 4.1% Christian Orthodox, 3.2% Anglican, 2.8% United Church, 1.6% Presbyterian, 11.1% Other), 11.6% Muslim, 5.5% Hindu, 2.5% Sikh, 1.0% Buddhist, 26.2% None

Median income: $51,200 (2020)

Average income: $74,100 (2020)

Members of Parliament

This riding has elected the following Members of Parliament:

Election results

References

Ontario federal electoral districts
Politics of Burlington, Ontario
Politics of Oakville, Ontario
2013 establishments in Ontario